Francesco Franceschi (died c. 1599) was a printer in the Italian Renaissance.  His roots were in Siena, though the bulk of his work was done in Venice.

Franceschi was known for the high quality of his engravings, which were done using metal plates rather than wooden, a common inexpensive alternative in the period.  Evelyn Tribble describes in detail his 1565 edition of Ludovico Ariosto's Orlando Furioso, which was influential for some English publishers, and which is heavily and ornately illustrated, including an engraving before every canto and an engraved frame surrounding the argument (Tribble 88).

Franceschi was also known for printing music.  According to the New Grove, he printed the works of Gioseffo Zarlino and several volumes of writing on music.  Two probable relatives, Giovanni Antonio de' Franceschi (who worked in both Palermo and Venice) and Giacomo Franceschi of Venice, printed music as well.

References
Boorman, Stanley: "Franceschi [de’ Franceschi]", Grove Music Online ed. L. Macy (accessed December 18, 2005), <http://www.grovemusic.com >.
Tribble, Evelyn B. Margins and Marginality: The Printed Page in Early Modern England. University of Virginia Press, 1993.

Italian printers
1599 deaths
16th-century Italian businesspeople
Year of birth unknown